Agnes Naa Momo Lartey is a Ghanaian politician. She contested in the 2020 Ghanaian General Election and won the parliamentary seat for the Krowor Constituency.

Early life and education 
She was born on 16 April 1976 and she comes from Greater Accra and a home town is Krowor and she is a Christian.

Politics 
Naa Momo began her political career in 2000. Since then, she has served as an assembly woman and a presiding member of the Krowor Municipal Assembly.

In December 2016, she contested in the 2016 Ghanaian General Election under the ticket of the National Democratic Congress and lost to Elizabeth Afoley Quaye of the New Patriotic Party. She contested again in the 2020 Ghanaian General Election under the ticket of the National Democratic Congress and won. She polled 41,850 votes which represents 55.80% of the total votes cast. She was elected over incumbent, Elizabeth Afoley Quaye of the New Patriotic Party and Hannah Bortey of the Ghana Union Movement. These two parties obtained 32,604 and 545 votes respectively out of the total valid votes cast. Representing 43.47%  and 0.73% respectively of total valid votes cast.

References 

Living people
1976 births
21st-century Ghanaian women politicians
National Democratic Congress (Ghana) politicians
Ghanaian MPs 2021–2025